The Men's sprint competition at the 2017 World Championships was held on 11 February 2017 at 14:45 local time.

Results

References

Men's sprint